Symbolophorus barnardi is a lanternfish in the family Myctophidae, found circumglobally in the southern hemisphere between about 30° S and 11° S at depths of between 100 and 800 m.  Its length is about 12 cm. It inhabits the deeper waters during the day, and migrates at night to the epipelagic zone.

References

 

Myctophidae
Fish described in 1932
Taxa named by Åge Vedel Tåning